(19 April 1944 – 9 October 2019) was a Polish forester, university teacher (professor of forestry) and politician who served as Minister of Environment in the cabinets of Jerzy Buzek (1997–1999), Kazimierz Marcinkiewicz (2005–2007), Jarosław Kaczyński (2007), Beata Szydło (2015–2017) and Mateusz Morawiecki (2017–2018).

He was elected to the Sejm on 25 September 2005, receiving 7,042 votes in the 20th Warsaw district, as a candidate on the Law and Justice list. He served in four consecutive parliamentary terms, having won re-election in 2007, 2011 and 2015.

The Pontifical Academy of Sciences recognized him with the 2008 Ettore Majorana Award. He was an honorary citizen of Krościenko nad Dunajcem and of Wieluń.

See also
Members of Polish Sejm 2005–2007

Footnotes

External links

Jan Szyszko – parliamentary page – includes declarations of interest, voting record, and transcripts of speeches.

1944 births
Politicians from Warsaw
Members of the Polish Sejm 2005–2007
Law and Justice politicians
Government ministers of Poland
Members of the Polish Sejm 2007–2011
Members of the Polish Sejm 2011–2015
2019 deaths
Members of the Polish Sejm 2015–2019
Foresters